Anime Revolution (abbreviated as AniRevo) is a three-day anime convention held annually in August in Vancouver, BC. Initially held in the East Wing of the Vancouver Convention Centre, (Canada Place) it has been held in the newer West Wing since 2017. While the name is similar, the convention has no connection to Anime Evolution.

Programming

Anime Revolution is notable for being the first anime convention in Vancouver to host voice actor guests from Japan and often features high-profile recording session performances. They also regularly bring in representatives from North American anime distributors such as Bandai and Crunchyroll. Their regular programming includes anime screenings, voice actor panels, as well as stage events including cosplay shows and the 70s Anime Dating Show.

History
Anime Revolution was launched in 2012 to meet demand for a new anime-focused convention in Metro Vancouver, after Anime Evolution (run by AE Convention Corp) had been cancelled in 2010. Since it began, the con has grown significantly, being the first anime convention in Metro Vancouver to surpass 10,000 attendees and eventually expanding its audience to more areas of Japanese pop culture such as gunpla and maid cafés.

Event history

References

Anime conventions in Canada
Summer events in Canada